

List of Rulers of the Bangwato (bamaNgwato)

Territory located in present-day Botswana.

Kgôsikgolo = Paramount Chief or King

(Dates in italics indicate de facto continuation of office)

Note

Ian Khama, the fourth president of Botswana, son of Seretse Khama (first president of Botswana after independence in 1966), though the rightful heir of the Bamangwato tribe in Serowe, has never shown interest in taking the chieftaincy and is not expected to, even though most of the people from the tribe regard him as their king.

Sources
http://www.rulers.org/botstrad.html

See also
Botswana
Heads of state of Botswana
Heads of government of Botswana
List of commissioners of Bechuanaland
Rulers of baKgatla
Rulers of baKwêna
Rulers of Balete (baMalete)
Rulers of baNgwaketse
Rulers of baRôlông
Rulers of baTawana
Rulers of baTlôkwa
Lists of office-holders

Botswana chiefs